Jack Knight Motorsport Ltd is a British engineering firm located in Camberley, Surrey, UK, specializing in gears and transmission parts.

History 
Jack Knight was a British engineer who was active in the racing field in the 1950s, 60's and 70's. His early achievements include "ERSA Knight" transaxle for 1960 Cooper T53 Formula One car, which was based on Citroen Traction Avant aluminium alloy transaxle case.

This transaxle brought World Drivers Championship title for Jack Brabham for 1960.

Later, his company, Jack Knight Motorsport Ltd, became known for specially made 5 speed gear sets for Hillman Imp transaxle, which was also used by several specialty car makers.

External links

References 

Engineering companies of the United Kingdom
Automotive motorsports and performance companies
Automotive transmission makers